Mackroy Peixote (born 11 May 1990) is an Indian footballer who currently plays for Laxmi Prasad in the Goa Professional League.

Career

Sporting Clube de Goa
In June 2011 Mackroy signed for Sporting Clube de Goa who play in the I-League. He then made his debut for Sporting Goa on 23 October 2011 against Prayag United in the I-League.

Laxmi Prasad and Goa
In September 2014 it was revealed that Peixote was playing in the Goa Professional League with Laxmi Prasad. He also played for the club in October in the Durand Cup.

In 2015, he was a part of the Goa Santosh Trophy team.

References

Indian footballers
1990 births
Footballers from Goa
Living people
I-League players
Goa Professional League players
Sporting Clube de Goa players
Association football forwards